is a 1999 Japanese television series directed by Takashi Miike.

Cast

Ayana Sakai as Man Kôda
Takashi Nagayama as Yuuya Narui
Chiaki Ichiba as Riona Mishima
Erika Yamakawa as Chiaki Amamiya
Eri Nomura as Maki Nishida
Chikako Ôba as Yukari Eda
Shiori as Maria Kanzaki
Aya Makinoda as Azumi Takizawa
Sayaka Kamiya as Sena
Hitomi Oota as Ayumi
Yuuki Fukuzono as Kenjirô
Tomonori Masuda as Satoshi
Kazuhiro Sakai as Taichi
Sara Matsuzaka as Minako
Megumi Yasu as Eimi
Yuuko Arai as Kasumi
Chika Kaidu as Rei
Kenta Kiritani as Hideki
Kaz as Sakakibara
Shingo Tsurumi as Bearded missionary/"God"
Tenmei Kano as Eda Isao
Tomoshi Uno as Akira
Michisuke Kashiwaya as Haruki
Hassei Takano
Kazumi Kamiizumi
Takehiko Tsuno
Shuuto Tsuji
Takahiro Araki
Shirô Sakamoto as Club DJ
Daisuke Nakagawa (actor)
Takaomi Maeda
Takashi Iwaki
Yuuki Nishio
Yuuki Sakamoto
Kazumi Nakazawa as Saint agency model
Tsubasa Otomiya as Saint agency model
Yukiko Haji as Saint agency model
Misuzu Sekine as Saint agency model
Mayo Suganô as Saint agency model
Hiromi Watanabe as Taichi's mother
Tenha Yokomori as Baby Taichi
Hirofumi Fukuzawa

Other credits
Produced by
Yuuji Ishida - planner, producer
Yasuhiro Kitsuda - producer
Nobuaki Murooka - producer
Wataru Tanaka - producer
Original music by
Kōji Endō	 	
Concerto Moon - theme song "When the Moon Cries"
Makeup department
Masarô Fukuda - special makeup effects artist
Yuuichi Matsui - special makeup effects supervisor
Fumihiro Miyoshi - special makeup effects artist
Miyuki Yamaguchi - special makeup effects artist
Special Effects by: Makoto Funabashi
Visual effects by
Masayoshi Obata - CGI director
Misako Saka - CGI producer

External links 
 

Films directed by Takashi Miike
Films set in Tokyo
Japanese high school films
1999 films
Japanese vampire films
1990s Japanese films